The Provisional Government (1868–1871) was a provisional government formed in Spain between the overthrow of Queen Isabella II of Spain on 30 September 1868 after the Glorious Revolution, and the inauguration of the new King Amadeo I of Spain before the Cortes on 2 January 1871.

It was the first phase of a 6-year period, known as the Sexenio Democrático (1868–1874).

The revolutionary spirit that had overthrown the Spanish government in September 1868 lacked direction. It was a coalition of 3 parties : the Unión Liberal headed by Francisco Serrano, the Progressive Party headed by Juan Prim and the Democratic Party.

The Cortes rejected the notion of a Republic and chose for a Constitutional monarchy.
 
This period can be divided in two :
 In the first period a new constitution was elaborated and enacted on 1 June 1869. 
 in the second period, between June 1869 and January 1871, a suitable new King who would respect the new constitution, was searched for. In the meantime Marshal Francisco Serrano, 1st Duke of la Torre was named Regent and Juan Prim, 1st Marquis of los Castillejos Prime Minister.

Sources 

Modern history of Spain
19th century in Spain
Provisional governments